Stick-in-the-jug may refer to
 Adenanthos, a plant genus
 More particularly, Adenanthos obovatus